The National Center for Mental Health, is a 4,200-bed psychiatric hospital occupying 47 hectares of land in the city of Mandaluyong, Philippines. It is PhilHealth-accredited.

History
Formerly known as the Insular Psychopathic Hospital, the Mandaluyong Mental Hospital, and the National Mental Hospital, was established on 17 December 1928. It was founded in order to accommodate the increasing number of mental patients and other patients with related nervous system conditions who, in 1925, were being taken care of by two hospitals, namely the San Lazaro Hospital (in its "Insane Department") and the City Sanitarium in the Philippines.

The insane asylum hospital was built under Philippine Public Works Act No. 3258 at a  location in Barrio Mauway, Mandaluyong, Rizal near the City of Manila. Patients from the San Lazaro Hospital were transferred to the National Center for Mental Health in 1928. Patients from the City Sanitarium were transferred in 1935. The National Center for Mental Health is currently under the Department of Health.

With the increasing number of patients being admitted, the center has resorted to soliciting donations from private sectors.

Controversy
There was a controversy at the center in 2012 because of the unexpected death of a 41-year-old male patient. The patient was confined in the hospital since 1998 due to paranoid schizophrenia attributed to drug abuse. The National Bureau of Investigation got involved, but the question remains whether the death was a medico-legal or homicide case.

See also
Mental health care in the Philippines
Psychiatric hospital

References

External links

Hospital buildings completed in 1928
Government buildings completed in 1928
1928 establishments in the Philippines
Hospitals in Metro Manila
Buildings and structures in Mandaluyong
20th-century architecture in the Philippines